Zhabchenko is a Ukrainian surname. Notable people with the surname include:

 Anatoliy Zhabchenko (born 1979), Ukrainian football referee
 Ihor Zhabchenko (born 1968), Ukrainian football coach

See also
 

Ukrainian-language surnames